Vardan Moivsisian (born 17 May 1976) is an Armenian judoka.

Achievements

See also
European Judo Championships
History of martial arts
Judo in Asia
List of judo techniques
List of judoka
Martial arts timeline

References

External links

1976 births
Living people
Armenian male judoka
Place of birth missing (living people)